Dipperu is a scientific national park in Queensland, Australia, 754 km northwest of Brisbane. The elevation of the terrain is 176 meters.

Wildlife 
226 species of animals have been recorded in the park, of which 7 are endangered species. Also 260 plants have their habitat here.

References

See also

 Protected areas of Queensland

National parks of Queensland
Protected areas established in 1969
North Queensland
1969 establishments in Australia